Libocedrus is a genus of five species of coniferous trees in the cypress family Cupressaceae, native to New Zealand and New Caledonia. The genus is closely related to the South American genera Pilgerodendron and Austrocedrus, and the New Guinean genus Papuacedrus, both of which are included within Libocedrus by some botanists. These genera are rather similar to the Northern Hemisphere genera Calocedrus and Thuja: in earlier days, what is now Calocedrus was sometimes included in Libocedrus. They are much less closely related, as recently confirmed (Gadek et al. 2000). The generic name means "teardrop cedar", apparently referring to drops of resin.

The leaves are scale-like, 3–7 mm long, in apparent whorls of four (actually opposite decussate pairs, but not evenly spaced apart, instead with the successive pairs closely then distantly spaced). The cones are 8–20 mm long, and have just 2 pairs of moderately thin, erect scales, each scale with a distinct spine 3–7 mm long on the outer face, and bearing two winged seeds on the inner face.

Species
The species recognized in the genus are:

The two New Zealand species, known individually by their Māori names kawaka (Libocedrus plumosa) and pāhautea (Libocedrus bidwillii), are sometimes called New Zealand cedars. No common names have been recorded for the three New Caledonian species.

Uses
The wood of Libocedrus is soft, moderately decay-resistant, and with a spicy-resinous fragrance. The two New Zealand species are also grown as ornamental plants.

References

Gadek, P. A., Alpers, D. L., Heslewood, M. M., & Quinn, C. J. 2000. Relationships within Cupressaceae sensu lato: a combined morphological and molecular approach. American Journal of Botany 87: 1044–1057. Abstract .

External links
New Zealand Plant Conservation Network, URL:Libocedrus bidwillii. Accessed 2010-10-04. 
New Zealand Plant Conservation Network, URL:Libocedrus plumosa. Accessed 2010-10-04.
Arboretum de Villardebelle. URL:Cone photos. Accessed 14 May 2007.
Gymnosperm Database, URL;Libocedrus. Accessed 14 May 2007.
Libocedrus, New Zealand Cedar

 
Conifer genera